Anton Shoutvin (born January 25, 1989) is an Israeli professional basketball player for Maccabi Haifa of the Liga Leumit.

Early life
Shoutvin was born in Voroshilovgrad, Ukraine.  He played for the Maccabi Tel Aviv Youth Team.

Professional career
On April 25, 2017, Shoutvin signed with Maccabi Haifa of the Israeli Premier League.

On September 24, 2017, Shoutvin signed with Ostrava of the Czech National Basketball League (NBL).

On November 7, 2017, Shoutvin signed with Trier of the German Pro-A league.

On October 13, 2018, Shoutvin signed a two-month contract with Maccabi Ashdod. On December 12, 2018, Shoutvin signed with Team FOG Næstved for the rest of the season. In 19 games played for Næstved, he averaged 12.5 points and 4.4 rebounds per game.

On May 27, 2019, Shoutvin signed with Hallmann Vienna of the Austrian Basketball League.

National team career
Shoutvin was a member of the Israeli U-18 and U-20 national teams.

References

External links
 Eurobasket profile
 RealGM profile
 FIBA profile

1989 births
Living people
Sportspeople from Luhansk
Hapoel Be'er Sheva B.C. players
Hapoel Galil Elyon players
Ironi Nahariya players
Israeli Basketball Premier League players
Israeli men's basketball players
Maccabi Ashdod B.C. players
Maccabi Givat Shmuel players
Maccabi Haifa B.C. players
Maccabi Tel Aviv B.C. players
Centers (basketball)
Power forwards (basketball)